Laura Kerber is an American research scientist at NASA's Jet Propulsion Laboratory studying planetary geology. Her research has covered explosive volcanism, wind erosion in deserts, and extraterrestrial caves. Her work focuses mainly on Mercury, Mars, and the Moon. Kerber graduated from Pomona College in 2006  and holds two master's degrees, in Geology and Engineering (Fluid Mechanics), and a PhD in Geology from Brown University.

As of 2018, Kerber serves as Principal Investigator for NASA Discovery Program mission candidate Moon Diver, which proposes to send the JPL-developed Axel extreme terrain rover into one of several deep volcanic collapse pits on the moon, rappelling down the wall to expose the history of the lunar mare in order to illuminate the workings of the flood basalt eruptions that created them.

Kerber also serves as Deputy Project Scientist on the 2001 Mars Odyssey orbiter, the longest-surviving continually active spacecraft in orbit around a planet other than Earth.

References 

Living people
NASA people
Planetary scientists
21st-century American geologists
Women planetary scientists
Jet Propulsion Laboratory
Year of birth missing (living people)
Pomona College alumni